Ole Bae (18 August 1902 – 28 September 1972) was a Norwegian civil servant.

He was born in Bremnes as a son of teacher Jakob Bae (1866–1963) and Anna Fladvad (1871–1954). He took commerce school in 1921, and worked his entire career in county administration. He started in Finnmark from 1922 to 1924, then after spending the year 1925 in Spain he was hired as a civil servant at the Nord-Trøndelag County Governor's office in 1926.

He was County Governor of Nord-Trøndelag from 1964 to 1972. Unlike many County Governors, he had no background in national politics, but had been a member of Steinkjer city council.

He was a Commander of the Order of the Polar Star and the Royal Norwegian Order of St. Olav (1971).

References

1902 births
1972 deaths
Norwegian civil servants
County governors of Norway
Politicians from Nord-Trøndelag
Order of the Polar Star